Abbasqulular is a village and municipality in the Goranboy Rayon of Azerbaijan. It has a population of 495.

References

Populated places in Goranboy District